Mega Man 10 is an action-platform video game developed by Inti Creates and Capcom. It is the tenth main entry of the original Mega Man series. The game was released as a downloadable title for the console gaming services WiiWare, PlayStation Network (PSN), and Xbox Live Arcade (XBLA) during March 2010. The game was also given a physical release along with four other Capcom titles from different franchises in the Capcom Essentials Pack for PlayStation 3 and Xbox 360. It was later released again for a physical and digital release as part of Mega Man Legacy Collection 2 alongside Mega Man 7, Mega Man 8 and Mega Man 9 for the PlayStation 4, Xbox One, and Microsoft Windows, as well as the Nintendo Switch in May 2018.

Mega Man 10 takes place in the 21st century, in which a disease begins infecting and disabling robots, hampering daily life for humans. The disease eventually causes many of the robots to malfunction and attempt to take over the world. The evil scientist Dr. Wily seeks help from the hero Mega Man. Wily states that a machine he devised, capable of finding a cure for the illness, is stolen by an infected robot. Mega Man decides to retrieve the machine; his brother and ally, Proto Man, decides to join him. Mega Man 10 is a traditional 2D side-scrolling game with action and platforming elements. Taking control of either Mega Man or Proto Man, the player must clear a set of eight stages. Destroying each stage's "Robot Master" boss adds its special weapon to the player's arsenal. Downloadable content (original release) or Unlockable content (Legacy Collection 2), which includes extra stages and Bass as a third playable character, was made available.

Mega Man 10 is a direct follow-up to Mega Man 9, which was released on the same three gaming services in 2008. The positive response from fans and critics prompted Capcom to continue this same style in Mega Man 10. The sequel to the game, Mega Man 11, was released in October 2018.

Plot
Mega Man 10 takes place during the 21st century ("20XX") and continues the adventures of the android hero Mega Man. An illness known as "Roboenza" suddenly begins infecting robots all over the world, causing them to malfunction and hamper human life. Mega Man's sister Roll becomes one of the disease's victims. A month following the outbreak, many of the infected robots go berserk and attempt to take over the world. The villain Dr. Wily comes to Mega Man and Dr. Light, claiming that he was building a machine making medicine to cure the disease before one of the infected robots stole it. Mega Man decides to help retrieve the machine and soon runs into his brother Proto Man, who quickly joins him. Meanwhile, Mega Man's rival Bass sets out on his own to challenge these new robots. Mega Man halfway finishes his journey when Dr. Wily completes a prototype antidote, which is given to Roll.

After all eight "Robot Masters" (which appear to be old models) – Sheep Man, Commando Man, Blade Man, Strike Man, Solar Man, Chill Man, Nitro Man and Pump Man – are defeated, Mega Man himself appears to have contracted Roboenza. The situation worsens once Dr. Wily appears on television and reveals that he created the virus, and only developed a cure so he could bribe all the infected robots into coming to work for him. Just as Roll gets out of bed, she gives Mega Man her medicine, saying she had been saving it in case "a really sick robot was brought in." However, she says that swallowing it will still render her unable to fight Wily, because Dr. Light created and programmed her with no built-in Variable Weapon System. So, Mega Man reluctantly takes Roll's dose so that he can go defeating Dr. Wily and bring back enough medicine for everyone else. During the raid on Wily's fortress, Proto Man comes down with Roboenza as well, only to be saved by Mega Man, who acquired an extra sample of the cure. A similar incident happens to Bass, the difference being that it is his robotic wolf Treble provides him with the cure. After chasing Wily out of his new fortress into his base in outer space, the heroes defeat him once again, only to discover Wily has become dangerously sick himself, possibly meaning the virus has mutated to infect humans. He is taken to the hospital, where he escapes a few days later. Perhaps out of debt to having his life saved, Wily leaves behind enough of the cure to restore the infected robots.

Gameplay
Mega Man 10 is an action-platformer like the games that came before it. The player is initially tasked with completing an octet of stages from a select screen. Each of these 2D side-scrolling stages contains obstacles and traps to overcome and enemies to shoot. Various power-ups such as health and weapon ammunition can also be found or picked up from defeated enemies. The end of the stage presents a boss battle with a Robot Master. Victory over the boss will earn the player its special weapon, which can be used throughout the remainder of the game. An in-game shop allows the player to use screws picked up in the stages to buy extra lives, energy tanks for refilling health and weapon power, and other useful items. At the start of Mega Man 10, the player is able to choose and play through the game as either Mega Man or Proto Man. Though the two characters play similarly, there are some fundamental differences. For example, unlike Mega Man, Proto Man is able to charge up his arm cannon for more powerful attacks, slide along the ground, and block small enemy shots with his shield. However, Proto Man takes twice the damage that Mega Man does, is knocked back twice as far when hit, and can only have two shots onscreen at a time versus Mega Man's three. Both characters have optional support abilities. Mega Man can call on his dog Rush to reach high platforms or traverse long distances in the air. Proto Man has the same capabilities in two generic support items.

Mega Man 10 includes several difficulty modes, which alters level layouts, enemy AI, and damage done to the player character. The game also includes a challenge mode where players can practice their skills in 88 mini-stages, which typically require the player to reach a goal or defeat an enemy. In April 2010, Capcom made downloadable content for Mega Man 10 available for purchase. This content includes a third playable character, three "Special Stages", and an endless stage. Like Mega Man and Proto Man, the third protagonist, Bass, has unique abilities. He has a rapid-fire arm cannon that can fire in several directions, but each shot does half the damage of one of Mega Man's shots, his shots cannot pass through walls, and he cannot move while shooting. He also has a dash maneuver for longer jumps and the ability to summon his wolf Treble to allow him to fly, provide him with power-ups, and save him from bottomless pits. The three Special Stages are based on levels in the Game Boy Mega Man entries and have bosses named "Mega Man Killers" from three of those games: Enker from Mega Man: Dr. Wily's Revenge, Punk from Mega Man III, and Ballade from Mega Man IV. Out of the three playable characters, only Mega Man is able to acquire their special weapons and use them in the main game.

When the game was later integrated as part of Mega Man Legacy  Collection 2, all the former downloadable content from the original release were integrated as part of the game and are instead unlocked either by completing the game once, or by entering the secret code at the Mega Man 10 title screen.

Development and release
Mega Man 10 was co-developed by Inti Creates and Capcom, who had also collaborated on the downloadable console game Mega Man 9 in 2008. Both games share "retro" 8-bit graphics and sound, resembling the first six games in the original Mega Man series for the NES. Producer Keiji Inafune, who was involved with nearly the entire franchise, stated that choosing such a "retro" style for Mega Man 9 was a huge, overwhelming success for the developers. The team decided that for the tenth installment, they should listen to both old-school gamers and former Mega Man players who have not recently played video games. Specifically, this meant adding the easy mode due to complaints about the extreme difficulty of Mega Man 9. The only challenge with creating the game, Inafune explained, was to meet the ever-increasing expectations that come with yet another installment.  The box art for Mega Man 10 is a tribute to, and inspired by, that of the original Mega Man.

Music
The game's soundtrack was composed and produced by Ippo Yamada, Ryo Kawakami, Hiroki Isogai, and Yu Shimoda. Various former composers in past installments in the main Mega Man series, returned to write single Robot Master themes for Mega Man 10, which included Manami Matsumae, Yasuaki Fujita, Minae Fujii, Mari Yamaguchi, Yuko Takehara, Makoto Tomozawa, Akari Kaida and Shusaku Uchiyama. According to Yamada, Mega Man 9 was developed as an spiritual successor to 1988's Mega Man 2, whereas Mega Man 10 is made up of "original pixel art and chip music, neither a remake nor a revival". Even the menu, game over, and get-a-weapon songs are new; the stage selection and stage clear jingles are the only two previously composed tracks included within the game. Two official soundtrack albums were released. Rockman 10 Original Soundtrack, which contains the original music from the  game itself, was released in Japan by Inti Creates on March 24, 2010. A second album titled Rockman 10 Image Soundtrack, which contains remixes of the songs from the game, was released in Japan on April 30, 2010.

Reception and legacy

Christian Svensson, Capcom's Senior Vice President of strategic planning and business development, stated that the company was pleased with the sales of Mega Man 10. The game has received generally favorable reviews, with aggregate Metacritic percentages of 81, 79, and 78 on WiiWare, XBLA, and PSN respectively. IGN's Colin Moriarty praised its gameplay, challenge mode, and the addition of Proto Man as a playable character, which he said adds more depth to the game. Moriarty expressed disappointment in its short length however, citing other games in the series with two ending castles (Mega Man 4 through Mega Man 6). 1UP.com's Jeremy Parish gave the game a B grade, calling it fun, but stating that it fails to capitalize its predecessor in a meaningful way, claiming overly similar gameplay, uninspiring level design, and forgettable music. Mega Man 10 was later released on the PlayStation 4, Xbox One, and PC as part of Mega Man Legacy Collection 2, which also made a slight change of allowing the player to unlock all of the former downloadable content without making any purchases. A digital version was later released on the Nintendo Switch in 2018.

Elements of the game were adapted into the Mega Man comic from Archie Comics, though the series went on indefinite hiatus before it could be fully adapted. Time travel stories in issues 20 and 55 involved Mega Man being shunted forward to the events of the game and Dr. Light experiencing a vision of them but not understanding the cause of so many Robot Masters going haywire.

References

External links

 
 

2010 video games
Inti Creates games
Mega Man games
PlayStation Network games
Retro-style video games
Side-scrolling video games
Single-player video games
Video game sequels
Video games about viral outbreaks
Video games developed in Japan
Video games scored by Ippo Yamada
Video games set in outer space
Video games scored by Akari Kaida
Video games scored by Manami Matsumae
Video games scored by Yasuaki Fujita
WiiWare games
Xbox 360 Live Arcade games
Superhero video games
Works set in computers